Valgjärve Parish was a rural municipality of Estonia, in Põlva County. It had a population of 1,562 (as of 1 January 2009) and an area of 143.02 km².

Settlements
Villages
Abissaare - Aiaste - Hauka - Kitse - Kooli - Krüüdneri - Maaritsa - Mügra - Pikajärve - Pikareinu - Puugi - Saverna - Sirvaste - Sulaoja - Tiido - Valgjärve - Vissi

See also
Valgjärve TV Mast

References

External links